Levashovo may refer to:
Levashovo, Saint Petersburg, a municipal settlement in Vyborgsky District of Saint Petersburg, Russia
Levashovo (air base)
Levashovo Memorial Cemetery
Levashovo, Vladimir Oblast, a rural locality (village) in Vladimir Oblast, Russia
Levashovo, name of several other rural localities in Russia